Mehmet Hulusi Conk (1881 in Smyrna (Izmir), Aidin Vilayet – January 10, 1950?) was an officer of the Ottoman Army and the Turkish Army.

Medals and decorations
Silver Medal of Liyakat
Silver Medal of Imtiyaz
Prussia Iron Cross
Medal of Independence with Red Ribbon

See also
List of high-ranking commanders of the Turkish War of Independence

Sources

External links

1881 births
1950 deaths
People from İzmir
People from Aidin vilayet
People from the Ottoman Empire of Circassian descent
Turkish people of Circassian descent
Ottoman Army officers
Turkish Army officers
Ottoman military personnel of the Balkan Wars
Ottoman military personnel of World War I
Turkish military personnel of the Greco-Turkish War (1919–1922)
Ottoman Military Academy alumni
Ottoman Military College alumni
Recipients of the Silver Liakat Medal
Recipients of the Silver Imtiyaz Medal
Recipients of the Iron Cross (1914)
Recipients of the Medal of Independence with Red Ribbon (Turkey)
Burials at Turkish State Cemetery